Conwy was a constituency of the National Assembly for Wales from 1999 to 2007. It elected one Assembly Member by the first past the post method of election. It was also one of nine constituencies in the North Wales electoral region, which elected four additional members, in addition to nine constituency members, to produce a degree of proportional representation for the region as a whole.

Boundaries
The constituency was created for the first election to the Assembly, in 1999, with the name and boundaries of the Conwy Westminster constituency. It was partly within the preserved county of Clwyd and partly within the preserved county of Gwynedd.

The other eight constituencies of the region were Alyn and Deeside, Caernarfon, Clwyd South, Clwyd West, Delyn, Vale of Clwyd, Wrexham and Ynys Môn.

The Conwy constituency was replaced for the 2007 Assembly election. Its area became partly within the Arfon constituency, and partly within the Aberconwy constituency. Arfon is entirely within the preserved county of Gwynedd and Aberconwy is entirely within the preserved county of Clwyd. Both of these constituencies are in the North Wales electoral region. For Westminster purposes, the new constituency boundaries became effective from the 2010 United Kingdom general election.

Voting
In general elections for the National Assembly for Wales, each voter has two votes. The first vote may be used to vote for a candidate to become the Assembly Member for the voter's constituency, elected by the first past the post system. The second vote may be used to vote for a regional closed party list of candidates. Additional member seats are allocated from the lists by the d'Hondt method, with constituency results being taken into account in the allocation.

Members of the National Assembly for Wales

Election Results

2003 Electorate: 55,291
Regional ballots rejected: 273

See also
 North Wales (National Assembly for Wales electoral region)
 National Assembly for Wales constituencies and electoral regions

References 

Former Senedd constituencies in the North Wales electoral region
1999 establishments in Wales
Constituencies established in 1999
2007 disestablishments in Wales
Constituencies disestablished in 2007